Rauno Sirk (born 27 June 1975 in Viljandi) is Estonian Brigadier General and the Commander of the Estonian Air Force since 2019.

2007-2009 he was the commander of Estonian Air Force's Headquarters. Since 2012 he is the commander of Ämari Air Base.

In 2008 he was awarded with Order of the Cross of the Eagle, IV class.

References

1975 births
Living people
People from Viljandi
Estonian brigadier generals
Recipients of the Military Order of the Cross of the Eagle, Class IV